Seloua Ouaziz (born 27 July 1974) is a Moroccan middle-distance runner. She competed in the women's 1500 metres at the 2000 Summer Olympics.

References

1974 births
Living people
Athletes (track and field) at the 2000 Summer Olympics
Moroccan female middle-distance runners
Olympic athletes of Morocco
Place of birth missing (living people)